George Jones Salutes Hank Williams is the 1960 country music studio album released in May 1960 by George Jones. The album was the ninth studio LP release, and was recorded in one session. The album has been reissued multiple times since its release, including the tracks being reused on many compilations.

The album was his second album release of the 1960s, and is one of the best sounding albums recorded with Mercury Records. Though the album didn't chart, however, it became one of his best sellers. All of the songs included were recorded by Hank Williams at some point in his short-lived career, and during this time of Jones' career, he had incorporated much of Williams singing style into his style.

Background
George Jones very often would cite Hank Williams as his biggest musical influence. Jones listened to him any chance he could get, and bought many of his records. He would even meet Williams during a radio show on KRIC in Beaumont, Texas where a young teenage Jones secured a gig backing old-timer country duet act Eddie and Pearl. In the liner notes to Cup of Loneliness: The Classic Mercury Years, Colin Escott quotes Jones telling his version of events to Ralph Emery: "Hank was appearing at the Blue Jean Club on the Port Arthur highway.  A dee-jay on KRIC was a good friend of Hank's, so he asked Hank to come by that afternoon before the dance.  I had an electric guitar.  I knew he was coming by, and I had learned 'Wedding Bells'.  He gets up to the microphone with the guitar, and he didn't let me kick it off.  I had done all that figuring out.  When he started singing, I loved his singing so much that I was dumbfounded.  I never hit one note.  My fingers just froze to the neck of the guitar."

In the 1989 video documentary, Same Ole Me, Jones admits, "I couldn't think or eat nothin' unless it was Hank Williams, and I couldn't wait for his next record to come out. He had to be, really, the greatest."  In his memoir, Jones recalled learning about Williams death on New Year's Day 1953 while he was serving a stint in the marines stationed in San Jose, California.  After a friend showed him the headline in the paper, Jones wrote that he "lay there and bawled", adding that "Hank Williams had been my biggest musical influence.  By that thinking you could say he was the biggest part of my life.  That's how personally I took him and his songs."  

The songs on George Jones Salutes Hank Williams feature some of the late country star's biggest hits, including "Cold, Cold Heart" and "Hey, Good Lookin'".  Jones would record a second Williams tribute album in March 1962 titled My Favorites of Hank Williams.

Recording and composition

Recording
Salutes Hank Williams was recorded on April 21, 1960, at Bradley Film and Recording Studio in Nashville, TN. All the tracks were produced by Jones' manager, Pappy Daily. The first track recorded was "Settin' the Woods on Fire," followed by "Window Shopping," and "Howlin' at the Moon." The next tracks recorded were "There'll Be No Teardrops Tonight," "Hey Good Lookin'," and "Half as Much." "Nobody's Lonesome for Me," "Cold, Cold Heart, "Why Don't You Love Me?," "Honky Tonkin'," "Jambalaya (On the Bayou)," and "I Can't Help It (If I'm Still in Love with You)." In an interview with the Country Music Hall of Fame, session guitar player Jimmy Capps recalled that all 12 sides were recorded in 3 hours, with George Jones singing live, and no playbacks. Other session personnel, according to Capps, were: Jimmy Day on steel guitar, Tommy Jackson on fiddle, and Buddy Killen on bass.

Composition
All the songs included on the album, but two, were written by Hank Williams. Williams himself, is widely regarded as the greatest songwriter in country music's history. Many of the songs on this album stand as a testament to that regard, the best songs including; Cold, Cold Heart, There'll Be No Teardrops Tonight, I Can't Help It (If I'm Still in Love with You), and novelty song Hey Good Lookin'''. The only songs not written by Williams was Settin' the Woods on Fire, written by Fred Rose with Ed G. Nelson, and Window Shopping'' by Marcel Joseph.

Track listing

Reception

The album became one of his very best sellers, and is some of Jones' best recordings during his time with Mercury Records from 1957-1962. Allmusic's Stephen Thomas Erlewine writes: "George Jones Salutes Hank Williams was recorded at Mercury Records, toward the beginning of Jones' career. At this stage, George still sounded similar to Hank Williams, but he had begun to incorporate much of Williams' vocal techniques into a distinctive vocal style of his own. If Jones had recorded these songs while still at Starday, they wouldn't be as exciting as they are now -- since he had moved beyond mimicking into his own style, he's able to invest Williams' songs with grit and passion, instead of just copying Hank. It's an affectionate, entertaining tribute, featuring some of the greatest songs ("Cold Cold Heart," "Hey Good Lookin'," "Half As Much," "Jambalaya," "Why Don't You Love Me," "Honky Tonkin'," "Settin' the Woods on Fire") in country music. (The 1984 reissue is slightly shorter than the original issue and features liner notes by Elvis Costello)."

References

External links
George Jones' Official Website
Record Label

1960 albums
George Jones albums
Hank Williams tribute albums
Mercury Records albums
Albums produced by Shelby Singleton